Robert Bemus Baldwin (April 24, 1923 – April 7, 2017) was a vice admiral in the United States Navy. He was a former commander of the United States Seventh Fleet (from July 24, 1976 – May 31, 1978). He also was a former Deputy Chief of Naval Personnel and Commander Naval Air Force, Pacific Fleet. He was a 1944 graduate of the United States Naval Academy. He retired in 1980 and died in 2017.

Baldwin was one of the 32 finalists for NASA Astronaut Group 1 in 1959, but ultimately was not selected.

References

1923 births
2017 deaths
United States Navy personnel of World War II
Military personnel from Minneapolis
Recipients of the Legion of Merit
Recipients of the Navy Distinguished Service Medal
United States Naval Academy alumni
United States Navy vice admirals